Howard J. Wiarda (1939 – 2015) was an American academic who was the Dean Rusk Professor of International Relations and Founding Head of the Department of International Affairs at the University of Georgia.  He also served in two think tanks in Washington, DC.

Wiarda was considered a major figure in the study of comparative politics and foreign policy.  He published extensively on Latin America, Iberia, International Relations, Development Policy, the Third World, Asia, Russia and Eastern Europe, and United States Foreign Policy.

Early life 
Howard J Wiarda was born in Grosse Pointe, Michigan, grew up in Grand Rapids, and was in the honors program at the University of Michigan where he received his BA degree. He earned M.A. and Ph.D. degrees at the University of Florida. He also earned a 
Master of Science at the National War College in 1993.

Wiarda married Dr. Iêda de Barros Siqueira, February 4, 1964.  She was a Brazilian American Research Specialist at the Library of Congress and Professor of Political Science at the University of Georgia. The couple had three children, Jon Wiarda, Howard Wiarda, and Kristy Williams.

Academic career 
 Dean Rusk Professor of International Relations and Founding Head of the Department of International Affairs at the University of Georgia.
 Senior Associate at the Center for Strategic and International Studies (CSIS)
 Senior Scholar at the Woodrow Wilson International Center for Scholars in Washington, D.C.

Honors, decorations, awards and distinctions 
Honorary doctorate and Honorary Professor at Nizhny Novgorod State University, Russia
Order of Christopher Columbus, by President Leonel Fernández, the highest honor that the Dominican Republic government can bestow. President Fernández is Wiarda's former student.
Fulbright-Hays Fellowship , 1964–65.

Published works

References 

1939 births
2015 deaths
People from Grosse Pointe, Michigan
Writers from Grand Rapids, Michigan
University of Michigan alumni
University of Florida alumni
University of Georgia faculty
Recipients of the Order of Christopher Columbus
Historians of political thought
Historians from Michigan